White Bolivians or European Bolivians are Bolivian people whose ancestry lies within the continent of Europe, most notably Spain and Germany, and to a lesser extent, Italy and Croatia.

Bolivian people of European ancestry mostly descend from people who arrived over the centuries from Spain, beginning five hundred years ago. 

European Bolivians are a minority ethnic group in Bolivia, accounting for 5% of the country's population. An additional 68% of the population is mestizo, having mixed European and indigenous ancestry.

History
Compared to the Indigenous population, considerably fewer white and mestizo Bolivians live in poverty.
Conceptions of racial boundaries in Bolivia may be fluid and perceptions of race may be tied to socioeconomic status, with the possibility of a person achieving "whitening" via economic advancement. Differences in language, educational status, and employment status may also reinforce perceptions of what constitutes a person as "white", "mestizo", or "Indigenous".

Numbers

Census data
In the official census in 1900, people who self-identified as "Blanco" (white) composed 12.72% or 231,088 of the total population. This was the last time data on race was collected. There were 529 Italians, 420 Spaniards, 295 Germans, 279 French, 177 Austrians, 141 English and 23 Belgians living in Bolivia.

Surveys
According to a 2014 survey by Ipsos, 3 percent of people questioned said they were white.

Geographic distribution
Geographically, the white and mixed-race populations of Bolivia tend to be centered in the country's eastern lowlands. The white and mixed-race Bolivians in this region are relatively affluent compared to poorer, predominantly Indigenous regions of Bolivia.

1900 census
According to the 1900 official Bolivian census, a person who self-identified as “Blanca” white was a descendant of a foreigner, principally a Spaniard. Overall there are Italians, Spanish, Germans and French. In total, they represented 12.7 percent of the total population with large populations in Cochabamba and Santa Cruz representing 36.8 percent combined.

Mennonites

In 1995, there were a total of 25 Mennonite colonies in Bolivia with a total population of 28,567. The most populous ones were Riva Palacios (5,488), Swift Current (2,602), Nueva Esperanza (2,455), Valle Esperanza (2,214) and Santa Rita (1,748). In 2002 there were 40 Mennonite colonies with a population of about 38,000 people. An outreach of Conservative Mennonites can be found at La Estrella, with others in progress.

The total population was estimated at 60,000 by Lisa Wiltse in 2010.
In 2012 there were 23,818 church members in congregations of Russian Mennonites, indicating a total population of about 70,000. Another 1,170 Mennonites were in Spanish-speaking congregations. The number of colonies was 57 in 2011.
In the Santa Cruz Department there is an important colony (70.000 inhabitants) of German-speaking Mennonites.

Culture

Caporales

Caporales is a dance popular in the Andean region of Bolivia. It gained popularity in 1969 by the Estrada Pacheco brothers, inspired by the character of the 'Caporal' or "overseer" of which, historically black slaves, usually mixed race, wore boots and held a whip, the dance originates from the region of the Yungas in Bolivia. The dance has European elements especially with the costumes.

Politics
White Bolivians and mestizos have tended to favor the political opposition against the Evo Morales administration.

Notable White Bolivians 

Ana María Ortiz - Bolivian Model
Romina Rocamonje - Bolivian model
Ronald Rivero - Bolivian football central defender
Fernando Saucedo - Bolivian footballer
Carlos Lampe - Bolivian footballer
Alejandro Chumacero - Bolivian politician
Alvaro Garcia Linera - Bolivian politician
Samuel Doria Medina - Bolivian politician
Jimena Antelo - Bolivian journalist
Chris Syler - Bolivian singer-songwriter
Lidia Gueiler Tejada - Bolivian politician

See also

Caporales
Croatian Bolivians
German Bolivians
Indigenous peoples in Bolivia
Italian Bolivians
Mennonites in Bolivia
Mestizos in Bolívia
History of the Jews in Bolivia

References and footnotes 

 
Ethnic groups in Bolivia
 
White Latin American